Blaze is a 2018 American biographical drama film directed by Ethan Hawke based on the life of country musician Blaze Foley. The screenplay by Hawke and Sybil Rosen was adapted from the memoir Living in the Woods in a Tree: Remembering Blaze by Rosen. It stars musician Ben Dickey as Foley. The film premiered at the 2018 Sundance Film Festival and was released in the United States on August 17, 2018, by IFC Films.

This was Kris Kristofferson’s final film appearance before his retirement.

Plot
The movie shows scenes of Foley's life and career, interspersed between two of Foley's friends being interviewed on the radio and his final performance and recording.

Cast

Production
Principal photography took place in and around Village Studios in East Feliciana, Louisiana and a small amount of photography in Mississippi in early 2017.

Reception
The website's critics consensus reads: "As lyrical and bittersweet as the music its subject left behind, Blaze takes a decidedly unconventional -- yet richly rewarding -- approach to the musical biopic." On Metacritic, the film has a weighted average score of 75 out of 100, based on 29 critics, indicating "generally favorable reviews".

On RogerEbert.com, Nick Allen raved that the film is "hands down the best movie of its kind since Inside Llewyn Davis" and added "This movie is all Foley, and the confidence in his words proves incredibly rewarding for Hawke as a cinematic storyteller himself."

References

External links
 

2018 films
2010s English-language films
Films directed by Ethan Hawke
American biographical films
Films about music and musicians
IFC Films films
Biographical films about musicians
2010s biographical films
2010s American films
2018 independent films